Nasteh Dahir Farah (1972 or 1973 – June 7, 2008) was a Somali reporter, and vice-president of the National Union of Somali Journalists. He was murdered in Kismayo, Somalia, on June 7, 2008.

Dahir, described as a "leading Somali journalist", was a local correspondent in Somalia for the British Broadcasting Corporation and the Associated Press news agency. He received death threats before being murdered. He was shot by gunmen and died in a hospital in Kismayo. Reporters Without Borders stated that the killers had not been identified, but the BBC and Al Jazeera reported that the killing had been attributed to Islamist insurgents.

See also
 Abdul Samad Rohani, a BBC journalist murdered on the same day or the following day in Afghanistan

References

1970s births
2008 deaths
Deaths by firearm in Somalia
Assassinated Somalian journalists
Associated Press reporters
2008 murders in Somalia